Calliostoma vilvensi is a species of sea snail, a marine gastropod mollusk in the family Calliostomatidae.

Description
The size of the shell varies between 12 mm and 23 mm.

Distribution
This marine species occurs off the Philippines and the Solomon Islands

References

 Poppe G.T. (2004) Descriptions of spectacular new species from the Philippines (Gastropoda - Trochidae, Cypraeidae). Visaya 1(1): 4–19.

External links
 

vilvensi
Gastropods described in 2004